Watubela is a language of the Maluku Islands, Indonesia.

External links

Central Maluku languages
Languages of the Maluku Islands